Rank comparison chart of Non-commissioned officer and enlisted ranks for armies/land forces of Anglophone states.

Enlisted

References

Military ranks of Anglophone countries
Military comparisons